WUFE (1260 AM) is a radio station broadcasting an oldies format. Licensed to Baxley, Georgia, United States, the station is owned by South Georgia Broadcasters, Inc. and features programming from ABC Radio .

In 2015, the station rebranded as "96.7 Lite FM." The station reverted to its original brand and oldies-format "The Big WUFE" in 2020.

References

External links

UFE
Radio stations established in 1954
1954 establishments in Georgia (U.S. state)
UFE